Krige is an Afrikaner surname that probably means "warrior" or "soldier" (German: Krieg = war). The oldest document where this family name appears is a church register dated April 1400.  The register shows the yearly contribution that the “Kryghe-hus” made to the church.  In later church documents the name mostly appear as Kriege, but variations like Krige, Krigee and Crigee is also found.

European origins
About 50 km from Lingen, Germany, lie the towns of Lengerich, Lienen, Ladbergen and Brochterbeck. These four towns fall within the County of Lingen and have been in the possession of the Counts of Tecklenburg for centuries. Lingen had a very violent history. It is in these towns that the history of the Kriges began.

Farming was a common way of life during the 1700s. The farms were usually passed down from the father to the oldest son. The other sons had to find another means to make a living. People with different trades travelled to Holland, America, the East Indian Colonies and South Africa.

Emigration to Cape Colony
Willem Adolph Kriege (second oldest son of Johan Henrich Kriege and Anna Mechtild Noordbeck) was one of these people. He left his country of birth on the ship “Het Vaderland Getrouw” and arrived in South Africa in 1721.  He worked for the Dutch East India Company as groomsman until 1724. On 20 December 1724, he signed a contract with Jacob de Villiers (a farmer at Bosch-en-Dal in Franschhoek) to work on the farm. On 11 December 1729 he married Johanna de Villiers, daughter of Jacob de Villiers.  He received citizenship from Governor Jan de la Fontaine in 1731.

Four children were born from the marriage:

Willem Adolph Kriege died in 1739, leaving behind his widow and small children.

References

Surnames
Afrikaans-language surnames
Surnames of German origin